Wombwell Colliers were a British motorcycle speedway team who operated between 1929 and 1965 based at the South Yorkshire Sports Stadium, Station Road, Wombwell, near Barnsley, England.

History
In February 1929, two speedway dirt tracks were laid out in Wombwell within 200 yards of each other. The first by the Darfield and District Motorcycle Club, on an old coursing field, off Ings Road, New Scarborough and the other at the greyhound racing stadium known as the South Yorkshire Sports Stadium.

The Ings Road track lasted one year and only held open meetings in 1929. The South Yorkshire Sports Stadium opened on 9 May 1929 and 8,000 people saw New Zealand rider Smokey Stratton open the track with a demonstration ride. The Stadium held open meetings in 1929 and then entered a team in the 1930 Speedway Northern League. They did not enter the league in 1931 and would not return until 1947. The Wombwell Colliers competed in the 1947 Speedway National League Division Three and 1948 Speedway National League Division Three.

Season summary

References

Defunct British speedway teams